Abdul Qadir Alam was the governor of Ghor Province in Afghanistan from 2004 to 2005. He was the second governor of the province after the fall of the Taliban.

See also 
 List of governors of Ghor

References

Governors of Ghor Province
Year of birth missing (living people)
Living people